Hina Ki Khushboo is a 2017 Pakistani drama serial directed by Sami Sani, produced by Babar Javed and written by Shabnam Sani. The drama starred Shameen Khan, Babar Khan and Arez Ahmed in lead roles, and first aired on 29 November 2017 on Geo Entertainment, where it aired on three evenings weekly on Thursday, Friday and Saturday at 9:00 P.M. The story revolved around the life of an innocent young woman named Hina who faces complications after her marriage.

Cast
Cast of the serial include;
Shameen Khan as Hina
Babar Khan as Adil
Farah Ali as Fassail (Dead)
Arez Ahmed as Azlan
Nazli Nasr as Iffat
Aleezey Tahir as Pari
Hassan Khan as Khurram
Sajid Shah as Hashim
Farah Nadir as Zainab (Dead)
Sadaf Aashan as Achi Phuphoo (Dead)
Anwar Iqbal as Samad
Salma Qadir as Savera

References

Pakistani drama television series
Urdu-language television shows
2017 Pakistani television series debuts
Geo TV original programming
2018 Pakistani television series endings